Raggamuffin Soldier is a studio album by Jamaican ragga recording artist Daddy Freddy. It was released in 1992 via Music of Life/Chrysalis Records. Recording sessions took place at Ameraycan Studios in North Hollywood, at HC&F Studio in New York, at Image Recording Studios and at Crystal Sound Recording in Hollywood. Production was handled by Robert Livingston, DJ Muggs, The Stone Cold Boners and Super Cat. It features guest appearances from Frankie Paul, Super Cat and Vicki Calhoun. The album spawned two singles: "Haul and Pull" and "Respect Due".

Critical reception
AllMusic's Ron Wynn praised Daddy Freddy's ability to juggle "idiomatic influences", calling it one of the few albums "to combine things from all styles rather than just throw them together". The Encyclopedia of Popular Music called Ragamuffin Soldier Daddy Freddy's best album. Reggae, Rasta, Revolution: Jamaican Music from Ska to Dub deemed it "the best and most diverse full ragga album available".

Track listing

References

External links

1992 albums
Daddy Freddy albums
Chrysalis Records albums
Albums produced by DJ Muggs